Trustor may refer to:
Trustor (trust law), a person who settles property on express trust for the benefit of beneficiaries
Trustor (agent), an entity that trusts another entity

See also 
Trustor affair, an investment company takeover
Trust (disambiguation)
 Trustee (disambiguation)